The 1971–72 Illinois Fighting Illini men's basketball team represented the University of Illinois.

Regular season

The 1971-72 Fighting Illini men's basketball season, led by head coach Harv Schmidt, experienced the a tale of two years, 1971 and 1972.  The Fighting Illini opened the season December 1, 1971, with a win over Butler and proceeded to win 7 of their next 8 games, finishing 1971 with an 8–1 record.  That streak would continue into January 1972 for one more game, the opening game of the Big Ten season.  After beating Northwestern the Fighting Illini would go on to drop 9 of their next 14 games, finishing the season with a 14–10 record, tied for 8th place in the conference.

The brightest spot of the season would shine upon junior forward Nick Weatherspoon.  Weatherspoon would return from a terrific sophomore campaign where he scored 381 points, averaging 16.5 points per game and collected 246 rebounds. During this season, 1971–72, he would score 500 total points, averaging 20.8 points and pull down 262 rebounds.

The 1971-72 team's starting lineup included Weatherspoon and Nick Conner at the forward spots, Jim Krelle and Garvin Roberson as guards and Bill Morris at center.

Roster

Source

Schedule
																																																
Source																																																																																																
																																																
|-																																																
!colspan=12 style="background:#DF4E38; color:white;"| Non-Conference regular season

	

|-
!colspan=9 style="background:#DF4E38; color:#FFFFFF;"|Big Ten regular season

	
|-

Player stats

Awards and honors
Nick Weatherspoon
Team Most Valuable Player

Team players drafted into the NBA

No Players Drafted

Rankings

References

Illinois Fighting Illini
Illinois Fighting Illini men's basketball seasons
1971 in sports in Illinois
1972 in sports in Illinois